Elisabeth Johanna Noordhof (24 February 1924 – 7 March 2013), known as Els Noordhof or Els Noordhof-Smith, was a Dutch-born portrait artist and book illustrator.

Early life 
Elisabeth Johanna Noordhof was born in 1924 in Bloemendaal, Holland, the daughter of Gosse Eilke Noordhof. She earned a Master of Fine Arts degree from the Rijksmuseum in 1945. Her older brother George H. Noordhof became a filmmaker in England.

Career 
Noordhof lived in England and the United States after World War II. She and her family settled in New Zealand in 1966. She had a studio in Dunedin, and taught at the University of Otago's summer arts schools in Kurow. She painted the official portraits of several mayors of Dunedin, though mayor Sukhi Turner was not fond of her Noordhof portrait, and replaced it with a photograph in the city council chambers. She was a patron of the Otago Art Society.

Books illustrated by Els Noordhof 

 Ruth Dallas, Ragamuffin Scarecrow (1969)
 Olive Smithells, Look After Your Back, Streamline Your Front (1970)
 Esther Glen, Six Little New Zealanders (1983)
 Esther Glen, Uncles Three at Kamahi (1985)

Personal life and legacy 
In 1949, while she was living in Cambridge, Noordhof married an American Fulbright scholar, Harold "Hal" Wendell Smith. They had four children. She was widowed when Smith died in 2006, and she died in 2013, aged 89 years. The National Library of New Zealand holds audio recordings of a 2002 oral history interview with Noordhof, conducted by Penelope Dunkley.

Her work was included in a 2017 exhibit, "About Face: Selected Portraits from the Collection", at the Eastern Southland Gallery.

References

External links 

 A 1967 ink portrait by Elisabeth Noordhof, of poet James K. Baxter, in the Alexander Turnbull Library.
"Boy and His Shadow" (circa 1976), a painting by Elisabeth Noordhof, in the collection of the Dunedin Public Art Gallery.
1969 newspaper photograph of Els Noordhof, Ruth Dallas and Keith Maslen, from a University of Otago Library exhibit.

1924 births
2013 deaths
Dutch artists
New Zealand artists
People from Bloemendaal
Academic staff of the University of Otago
Dutch expatriates in the United Kingdom
Dutch expatriates in the United States
Dutch expatriates in New Zealand
Artists from Dunedin